Eleutherodactylus glamyrus is a species of frog in the family Eleutherodactylidae. It is endemic to western Cuba and known from isolated populations in Sierra Maestra, in the Granma and Santiago de Cuba provinces.

Its natural habitat is closed mesic cloud forest at elevations of  asl. It is an arboreal species, but eggs are laid on the ground. Although a common in suitable habitat, it is declining in abundance. Major threat to is deforestation caused by agriculture, woodcutting, disturbance from tourist activities, and infrastructure development.

References

glamyrus
Endemic fauna of Cuba
Amphibians of Cuba
Amphibians described in 1997
Taxonomy articles created by Polbot